Davy Frick (born 5 April 1990) is a German footballer who plays as a midfielder for FSV Zwickau.

Career
Born in Triptis, Frick made his professional debut in the German 3. Liga with FSV Zwickau against Dynamo Dresden on 31 July 2010.

References

1990 births
Living people
People from Saale-Orla-Kreis
Association football midfielders
German footballers
Footballers from Thuringia
FC Carl Zeiss Jena players
FSV Zwickau players
3. Liga players